Edwin Woodward (17 September 1864 – 15 December 1953) was an English cricketer active in the late 1880s and beginning of the 1890s.  Born at Sutton-in-Ashfield, Nottinghamshire, Woodward was a right-handed batsman and right-arm medium pace bowler who made two appearances in first-class cricket.

Woodward made his debut in first-class cricket for Liverpool and District against the touring Australians in 1888 at Aigburth Cricket Ground, Liverpool. He played a second first-class match for Liverpool and District in 1890 against Yorkshire, during which he took the wickets of Louis Hall and Jack Brown, which were his only wickets in first-class cricket.

He died at Mansfield, Nottinghamshire on 3 January 1953.

References

External links
Edwin Woodward at ESPNcricinfo
Edwin Woodward at CricketArchive

1864 births
1953 deaths
Cricketers from Sutton-in-Ashfield
English cricketers
Liverpool and District cricketers